The Journal of the European Optical Society: Rapid Publications is an online open access peer-reviewed scientific journal published by the European Optical Society. According to the Journal Citation Reports, the journal has a 2020 impact factor of 1.528.

The journal publishes articles in all areas of optical science and technology with a focus on:

 information optics
 quantum optics
 electro-optics 
 optical design
 imaging
 adaptive optics
 THz-imaging
 electro-magnetic scattering
 diffractive optics
 biomedical optics/biophotonics
 nonlinear optics

The editors-in-chief are Kai Erik Peiponen (University of Eastern Finland), Richard Michael De La Rue (University of Glasgow), and Gerd Leuchs (Max Planck Institute for the Science of Light).

References

External links
 

Optics journals
Open access journals
English-language journals
Academic journals associated with international learned and professional societies of Europe